Dolores Olga Claman (July 6, 1927July 17, 2021) was a Canadian composer and pianist. She is best known for having composed the 1968 theme song for Canadian Broadcasting Corporation's (CBC) Hockey Night In Canada show, known simply as "The Hockey Theme", which many consider Canada's unofficial second national anthem. She is also known for "A Place to Stand", the tune that accompanied the film of the same name at Montreal's Expo 67 Ontario pavilion. This is regarded as Ontario's de facto provincial anthem.

Early life
Claman was born in Vancouver on 6 July 1927.  Her mother worked as an opera singer and Claman first learned the piano in her hometown.  After graduating from high school by the age of 16, she studied music and drama at the University of Southern California.  Intending to become a concert pianist, she then studied at the Juilliard School on a fellowship.  There, she was under the tutelage of Rosina Lhévinne and Eduard Steuermann for piano, as well as Vittorio Giannini and Bernard Wagenaar for composition.  Claman's interest in jazz music was piqued and she opted to go into composition instead.  After graduating, she moved to London, England in 1953.

Career
In the 1950s, Claman composed music for ITV while living in Britain and also wrote songs for West End musical revues. She later moved to Toronto with her writing partner and husband, lyricist Richard Morris. Together they composed over 3,000 commercial jingles in a 30-year period and won more than 40 awards internationally for their work. Claman's two best-known songs, "A Place to Stand" and "The Hockey Theme", were orchestrated by Jerry Toth who, along with his brother Rudy Toth and composer Richard Morris, all worked together at Quartet Productions from 1965-1970.

Claman commenced legal action against the CBC in 2004, alleging the network had made unauthorized use of "The Hockey Theme" in various programs, including NHL Centre Ice, and by selling it as a cellular phone ringtone and using it outside of Canada. On 9 June 2008 it was announced that Claman had sold the rights to the song to private broadcaster CTV. The majority owner of The Sports Network, which also broadcasts hockey games, acquired the rights to the song in perpetuity after an announcement by the CBC that a deal between the public broadcaster and Claman could not be reached.

The popularity of "The Hockey Theme" resulted in many children sending letters and pictures to Claman over the years. On 20 June 2016, Claman was awarded the Cultural Impact Award for "The Hockey Theme" at the SOCAN Awards in Toronto.

Personal life
Claman married Richard Morris in 1957.  They met while she was living in London, and they remained legally married until her death though separated. He resided in Spain and she continued to reside in London.   Together, they had a daughter: Madeleine and a son Michael. Claman died on 17 July 2021 in Spain. She was 94, and suffered from dementia in the two years prior to her death.

See also 

 Music of Canada
 List of Canadian composers

References

External links
 
 Hockey Theme Homepage
 
 A Place to Stand, 1967, Archives of Ontario YouTube Channel

1927 births
2021 deaths
20th-century Canadian composers
Deaths from dementia in Spain
20th-century women composers
Musicians from Vancouver
Canadian women composers
University of Southern California alumni
Juilliard School alumni